The Società Savonese di Storia Patria (SSSP) is a non-profit historical society founded in 1885. Its registered location is in Savona: its statutory interests are directed towards historical Liguria, and so they cover an area wider than the current homonym Italian region.

History 
The Società Savonese di Storia Patria was founded on 27 December 1885 with the name of Società storica savonese by a group of intellectuals at the request of Paolo Boselli, the future Prime Minister. In 1916 it assumed its present name.

Social activities and library 

The social activity is coordinated by a board of council members and it is mainly expressed in the publication of an annual volume of Atti e memorie and other publishing activities (magazine Sabazia, editorial series Zetesis and Novecento). The non-publishing activities are very intense and they include historical conferences, also organized with other institutions, and interventions more closely linked to the cultural life. The Society owns a specialized library of more than 50,000 titles.

Historical Toponymy Project  
The main ongoing research of the society is represented by the Progetto Toponomastica Storica (Historical Toponymy Project) that collects and studies historical place names; the project began in 2011 and up to now has published over 50,000 pre–19th century toponyms, related to Liguria and Piedmont.

Presidents 
 1885–1932 Paolo Boselli
 1932–1941 Filippo Noberasco 	
 1948–1964 Italo Scovazzi
 1964–2007 Carlo Russo (honorary president)
 1964–1972 Lorenzo Vivaldo
 1972–1978 Adele Restagno
 1978–1984 Giulio Fiaschini
 1984–1990 Carlo Varaldo
 1990–2000 Almerino Lunardon
 2000–2002 Furio Ciciliot
 2002–2005 Marco Castiglia
 2005–2011 Carmelo Prestipino
 2011–2013 Francesco Murialdo
 2013–2018 Carmelo Prestipino
 2018–present Furio Ciciliot

See also 
 Paolo Boselli

External links 
 Official site, storiapatriasavona.it

1885 establishments in Italy
Historical societies of Italy